Eukaryotic translation initiation factor 4 gamma 2 (also called p97, NAT1, and DAP-5) is a protein that in humans is encoded by the EIF4G2 gene.

Function 

Translation initiation is mediated by specific recognition of the cap structure by eukaryotic translation initiation factor 4F (eIF4F), which is a cap binding protein complex that consists of three subunits: eIF4A, eIF4E and eIF4G. The protein encoded by the eIF4G2 gene shares similarity with the C-terminal region of eIF4G1 that contains the binding sites for eIF4A and eIF3. eIF4G2 additionally contains a binding site for eIF4E at the N-terminus. Unlike eIF4G1, which supports cap-dependent and independent translation, the eIF4G2 gene product functions as a general repressor of translation by forming translationally inactive complexes. In vitro and in vivo studies indicate that translation of this mRNA initiates exclusively at a non-AUG (GUG) codon. Alternatively spliced transcript variants encoding different isoforms of this gene have been described.

Interactions 

EIF4G2 has been shown to interact with EIF3A.

References

Further reading